is a Japanese, bilingual singer-songwriter based in Tokyo.

Biography
Emyli debuted at the age of 15 from BMG Japan with her first single, "Rain." Since the release of her first album "Flower of Life," she has performed and toured with popular acts such as M-Flo and Shinhwa. Upon graduating Sophia University, she has been writing songs for J-Pop as well as K-Pop artists such as Namie Amuro, E-Girls, May J., SOL (BIG BANG), etc.

Discography

Studio albums
 Flower of Life (2003)

Singles
 Rain (2003)
 Someday (2003)
 Voice of Love (2003)
 The Other Side of Love (m-flo feat. Sister E) (2003)
 DOPAMINE (m-flo loves EMYLI & Diggy-Mo') (2005)
 Loop in My Heart (m-flo loves EMYLI & Yoshika) (2005)
 Come Home (2005)
 Don't Vanish Love (2006)
 HIGHWAY STAR - Featuring Vocal Emyli - (Shinhwa feat. Emyli) (2006)
 Day by Day (2007)
 Tekitō Lover (Emyli feat. VERBAL) (2007)
 love comes and goes  (m-flo loves Emi Hinouchi & Ryohei & Emyli & Yoshika & LISA) (2008)
 Take Me Away (2010)
 Your #1 (MAKAI feat. Emyli & WISE) (2010)
 I Belong 2 U (MAKAI feat. Emi Hinouchi & Emyli & Hiromi) (2010)
 Wanna Dance (2010)
 Champion (TCY FORCE feat. Emyli) (2010)
 come on & Let's go (BACK-ON feat. Emyli, kailis from OVERDOSE (2012)

Songwriting work 
2010
 CHOCOLAT / TCY FORCE feat. Mariya Ise
 Champion / TCY FORCE feat. Emyli
2011
 Merry-Go-Round / MAKAI feat. AISHA
 Roller Coaster / MAKAI feat. JONTE
 SCANDALOUS / Maki Goto
 Do It! Do It! / KARA
2012
 RAINBOW / May J.
 Say "Ah!" / May J.
 Kimi Ga Irukara〜Kokoro No Tonari De～ / BRIGHT
 Hello / RAINBOW
 Kiss! Kiss! Disco! / RAINBOW
 Energy / RAINBOW
 Touch Me, Feel Me, Love Me / RAINBOW
 CANDY GIRLS! / RAINBOW
 SPEED UP / KARA
 No Goodbyes / 2PM+2AM'OneDay'
 Lost feat. Jinwoon from 2AM / Nicole of KARA
 ELECTRIC BOY / KARA
 Rewind / May J.
2013
 JUST IN LOVE / E-Girls
 Hey Pretty Girl / 2AM
 First Love / 2AM
 Oh / Chansung of 2PM
 BOOM! BOOM! / Dream (Japanese band)
 Take it easy! / E-girls
 Boom! Boom!/ Dream
 Waterfalls (20th Anniversary Version) / Namie Amuro
 Heaven / Namie Amuro
 Like a star / ジュノ (2PM)
 目を閉じて / ジュノ (2PM)
 Heartbreaker / ジュノ (2PM)
 I love you / ジュノ (2PM)
 Winter Love〜愛の贈り物〜 / E-Girls
2014
 Wanna Wanna Go! / Dream (歌手グループ)
 So Wonderful / ニックン (2PM)
 Give Up / ウヨン (2PM)
 EYES,NOSE,LIPS(日本語バージョン) / Taeyang from Big Bang (South Korean band)
2015
 Still Lovin' You / Namie Amuro
 Photogenic / Namie Amuro
 Birthday / Namie Amuro
 Fashionista / Namie Amuro
 Want U Bag / Melody Day
2016
 Mint / Namie Amuro
 I'M YOUNG / Taehyun (WINNER)
 Sekaiichi / A.B.C-Z
 Neon Twilight / FEMM
 Kaketa Tsuki / Shion Miyawaki
 D. Island / Doberman Infinity
 Fighter / Namie Amuro
 Christmas Wish / Namie Amuro
2017
 Just You And I / Namie Amuro
 Never Ever / Beverly
2019
 Sappy / Red Velvet

References

 Oricon Style (2007), Style Online
 Emyli Official Website,

External links
 Emyli Official Website
 Hotexpress.com interview (in Japanese)
 Oricon profile (in Japanese)
 J-Pop World interview
 Emyli LiveJournal Fan Community

1988 births
Japanese women pop singers
Living people
Singers from Tokyo
21st-century Japanese singers
Sophia University alumni
21st-century Japanese women singers